Iván Claudio Lío (born 16 February 1997) is an Argentine professional footballer who plays as a defender for Deportivo Español.

Career
Lío was a part of the Almagro academy until 2015, with the defender subsequently having a three-year stint in the youth of Deportivo Riestra. In 2018, following a spell in the lower ranks of Ferrocarril Midland, Lío joined Deportivo Español of Primera B Metropolitana. His professional debut arrived on 2 September versus San Miguel, which was the first of ten appearances he made in 2018–19 as they were relegated; he finished the season with two red cards, against Flandria and ex-club Deportivo Riestra respectively.

Career statistics
.

References

External links

1997 births
Living people
People from Ramos Mejía
Argentine footballers
Association football defenders
Primera B Metropolitana players
Deportivo Español footballers
Sportspeople from Buenos Aires Province